Madison-Eastend is a neighborhood in the heart of East Baltimore, Maryland. Madison-Eastend occupies 66.7 acres of land north of Patterson Park and south of Amtrak's Northeast Corridor. The neighborhood is bounded by the neighborhoods of Ellwood Park and McElderry Park to the south, Milton-Montford to the west, Biddle Street to the north, and Orangeville to the east. The swath of land between Johns Hopkins Hospital and Frank C Bocek Park, which includes Madison-Eastend, is often referred to as the "Down the Hill" neighborhood by local residents.

Demographics
Madison-Eastend is 90% African-American. The neighborhood is one of the least expensive neighborhoods in the United States, with the median price of housing being less than $50,000.

Health
Life expectancy is between 63 and 69 years old. Madison-Eastend suffers from high levels of cancer, HIV/AIDS, and homicide compared to other neighborhoods of Baltimore. There is a brownfield in Madison-Eastend due to environmental contamination caused by factories, refineries, and other businesses polluting the land and water. Trains used the area to dump coal, causing the land at the brownfield to become hard and blackened by oil.

History

The majority of the neighborhood lies within the East Monument Historic District. The district is historically significant due to the large Czech-American immigrant community that once lived in the area. Madison-Eastend has since transitioned to a majority African-American neighborhood.

References

External links

Madison-Eastend, Live Baltimore

African-American history in Baltimore
Czech-American culture in Baltimore
 
Neighborhoods in Baltimore
Poverty in Maryland
Working-class culture in Baltimore